Joe Adam is an American football coach. He is the head football coach at Saint Anselm College in Goffstown, New Hampshire, a position he had held since the 2016 season.  Adam served as the head football coach at Elmhurst College in Elmhurst, Illinois in 2013 and as an assistant coach at Syracuse University from 2014 to 2015.

Head coaching record

College

References

External links
 Saint Anselm profile
 Syracuse profile

Year of birth missing (living people)
Living people
Elmhurst Bluejays football coaches
Grand Valley State Lakers football coaches
Saint Anselm Hawks football coaches
Syracuse Orange football coaches
Western Michigan Broncos football coaches
High school football coaches in Illinois
Junior college football coaches in the United States
Grand Valley State University alumni